Panos Papadopulos (Greek: Πάνος Παπαδόπουλος; 1 August 1920, in Kerassus, Ottoman Empire – 18 February 2001, in Munich) was a Greek actor.

Selected filmography

 Hello, Fraulein! (1949) – Musiker
 Jonny Saves Nebrador (1953)
 The Cousin from Nowhere (1953)
 Conchita and the Engineer (1954)
 Beloved Corinna (1956) – Longo
 The Copper (1958) – Heini – der Taschendieb (uncredited)
 Peter Voss, der Millionendieb (1958) – Doctor – Hong Kong (uncredited)
  (1958)
 Rommel Calls Cairo (1959) – Sharani
 The Tiger of Eschnapur (1959) – Courier (uncredited)
 The Indian Tomb (1959) – Dagh's messenger (uncredited)
 The Death Ship (1959) – Popoff, Bulgarischer Dockarbeiter
 Salem Aleikum (1959)
 Peter Voss, Hero of the Day (1959) – Hoteldiener (uncredited)
 The Crimson Circle (1960) – Matrose Selby
 Weit ist der Weg (1960) – Nelito
 Hotel der toten Gäste (1965) – (uncredited)
 For a Few Dollars More (1965) – Sancho Perez (Indio's Gang)
 Immer bei Vollmond (1970)
 Zum Abschied Chrysanthemen (1974)
 Derrick: Stiftungsfest  (1974, TV series episode) – Nachtportier
 Fedora (1978) – Bartender
 Die Momskys oder Nie wieder Sauerkraut (1981) – Momsky
 Ich bin dein Killer (1982) – Flopp
 Otto – Der Film (1985) – Stavros

References

External links
 

1920 births
2001 deaths
Greek male film actors
Greek male television actors
Pontic Greeks
People from Giresun
Male Spaghetti Western actors
Emigrants from the Ottoman Empire to Greece
Greek expatriates in Germany